Manhunt International Philippines is a beauty pageant in the Philippines open to male contestants.

Titleholders

See also
 Philippines at Major International Male Beauty Pageants
Mister World Philippines
Misters of Filipinas

References

Manhunt International

External links 
 Official Website
 Pageantopolis' Manhunt International page

 
Recurring events established in 1993